Herbert Morawetz (October 16, 1915-Oct. 29, 2017) was a Czechoslovakian-American chemical engineer. He was a professor of chemistry at Polytechnic Institute of Brooklyn; now New York University. His work focused on polymer chemistry and macromolecules.  He published two books: Macromolecules in Solution and Polymers  and The Origins and Growth of a Science  both Wiley). A Distinguished Lecture Series in his honor and celebrating his love of learning, a passion for teaching, and a commitment to scientific inquiry was inaugurated in 2003 by NYU's Tandon School of Engineering. Initially funded by two of his grateful former students, the series commemorates his intellectual curiosity and wide-ranging interests by covering all areas of scientific endeavor, from Anthropology to Zoology  .

Personal life 

Herbert's wife Cathleen Synge Morawetz was a prolific mathematician at NYU. His sister Sonja Morawetz Sinclair revealed in 2017 she was a WW2 codebreaker after seven decades of secrecy by Bletchley Park Signals Intelligence. He helped organize the defection of Mikhail Barishnikov from the USSR 1974.  His brother, Oskar Morawetz was a Canadian composer Oskar Morawetz.  His brother John Morawetz was a Canadian businessman.

References 

1915 births
2017 deaths
American chemical engineers
Engineers from Prague
Polymer chemistry
Czechoslovak emigrants to the United States